Sree Narayana College, Chempazhanthy, is a general degree college in Chempazhanthy, Thiruvananthapuram district, Kerala. It was established in 1964. The college is affiliated with Kerala University. It offers courses in arts, commerce and science.

The Sree Narayana College, Chempazhanthy, on an undulating verdant campus of 30 acres, was formally inaugurated on 20 July 1964, by Sri. R. Sankar the then Chief Minister of Kerala. Prof. T.C. Rajan, the noted social scientist, was the first principal.

Self Financing
There is a self financing college: Sree Narayana Guru College of Advanced Studies, Chempazhanthy  
(SNGCAS) started in 2013.
The Self-Financing College offers the following courses:
       MA English
       M.Com       
       BA English
       BSc Geography
       BSc Geology
       BSc Chemistry
       BSc Physics.
       B.Com Tax Procedure and Practice
       B.Com Corporation

Departments

Post graduation

MA English
MSc Chemistry 
MA History

Science

Physics
Chemistry
Mathematics
Statistics
Geology
Botany
Zoology
Psychology

Arts and Commerce

Malayalam
English
Hindi
History
Political Science
Economics
Sociology
Physical Education
Commerce

Accreditation
The college is recognized by the University Grants Commission (UGC).

Notable alumni
V. Sivankutty, Minister of Education, State of Kerala
Prem Kumar (Malayalam actor)
 Raj Kalesh, Anchor, Magician, Stage performer
MA Vaheed, ex MLA
RS Vimal, film director
Kadakampally Surendran, minister
D. K. Murali, MLA
V. Joy, MLA
M. M. Hassan, former minister

References

External links
http://www.sncollegechempazhanthy.ac.in

Universities and colleges in Thiruvananthapuram district
Educational institutions established in 1964
1964 establishments in Kerala
Arts and Science colleges in Kerala
Colleges affiliated to the University of Kerala